Weiße Rose (White Rose) is a chamber opera in one act by Udo Zimmermann. The opera tells the story of Hans and Sophie Scholl, a brother and sister in their early twenties, who were guillotined by the Nazis in 1943 for leading Die Weiße Rose, a non-violent resistance group. The opera premiered at the Dresden Conservatory on 17 June 1967 with a German libretto by the composer's brother, a well known journalist and writer in Germany. The opera was received fairly well. Zimmermann revised it the following year for a professional production in Schwerin.

The opera became an international success and has had performances at many of the world's leading opera houses and with leading orchestras including the Vienna State Opera, Komische Oper Berlin, Zurich Opera, the Salzburg Festival, and the Israel Philharmonic Orchestra among many others. The United States premiere of the opera was presented by Opera Omaha in 1988 with soprano Lauren Flanigan as Sophie.

Roles

Recordings 
 Die weiße Rose with Udo Zimmermann (conductor), Gabriele Fontana (Sophie), Lutz-Michael Harder (Hans) and the Instrumentalensemble München. Released on the Orfeo label in 1988. Cat: 162871
 Weiße Rose with Udo Zimmermann (conductor), Grazyna Szklarecka (Sophie), Frank Schiller (Hans), Musica Viva Chamber Orchestra, Berlin Classics, 2005.

Notes

References

Sources 
 F. Hennenberg: Udo Zimmermann: Leidenschaft Musik – Abenteuer Theater: Komponist – Intendant – Dirigent (Bonn, 1992)
 M. Ernst, ed.: Udo Zimmermann: ein Fünfzigjähriger im Spiegelbild von Zeitgenossen: eine Biographie in Zitaten (Leipzig, 1993)
 Lars Klingberg. "Zimmermann, Udo." Grove Music Online. (subscription access)

External links 
 Udo Zimmermann (*1943) / White Rose (First Version 1967/68) / Opera in 8 Scenes 1967/68 Duration: 100' Text: Ingo Zimmermann Breitkopf & Härtel

Operas
1967 operas
1986 operas
German-language operas
Operas by Udo Zimmermann
Operas set in Germany
Operas based on real people
Operas set in the 20th century
Cultural depictions of Hans and Sophie Scholl